McEwan, an Australian Electoral Division in the Australian state of Victoria, has existed since 1984.


Members

Election results

Elections in the 2020s

2022

Elections in the 2010s

2019

2016

2013

2010

Elections in the 2000s

2007

Rob Mitchell was initially been announced as the winning candidate, by a mere seven votes. The first recount reduced this margin to five. The second re-count overturned the result with Fran Bailey instead winning by 12 votes. The Court of Disputed Returns later increased this margin to 27 votes.

2004

2001

Elections in the 1990s

1998

1996

1993

1990

Elections in the 1980s

1987

1984

Notes

References

Australian federal electoral results by division